Guharam Ajgalle (born 30 April 1967) is an Indian Politician and member of the Bharatiya Janata Party. He is Member of Parliament in 17th Lok Sabha representing Janjgir constituency of Chhattisgarh.

References

External links
 Home Page on the Parliament of India's Website

Bharatiya Janata Party politicians from Chhattisgarh
Living people
1967 births
India MPs 2004–2009
Lok Sabha members from Chhattisgarh
People from Raigarh district
India MPs 2019–present